George Stoyanov Yanakiev  (May 6, 1941 – March 1, 2018) was a Bulgarian artist, one of the main representatives of the Bulgarian graphics, illustration and painting.

Biography 
Born on May 6, 1941 in Veselie, Bourgas District. His childhood and youth were bygoned in the Burgas region. In 1964 he was admitted to the National Academy of Sofia with graphics. In 1970 he graduated with honors and was awarded the honor by the then first secretary of the BCP Todor Zhivkov.

In 1971 he was assigned to work in Sliven, where he works in Municipality of Sliven. There are as many solo exhibitions and participated in general, regional, district and group exhibitions. For many years he was professor of painting at the National Art School "Dimitar Dobrovich" in Sliven. He was a member of the Union of Bulgarian Artists.

In 2014 he received a severe ischemic stroke.

He dies on March 1, 2018 from cancer.

individual exhibitions 
 2011 – Solo Exhibition, Gallery "May", Sliven
 2012 – Exhibition pastel, Gallery "Bogoridi" Burgas
 2013 – Solo Exhibition, Gallery "May", Sliven

External links 
 Google Maps
 Google+
 sliven-news.com 
 sl-news.sliven.net
 public-republic.com 
 Facebook Page
 Blog.bg
 Youtube
 Slivenpress.bg 

Bulgarian artists
Bulgarian illustrators
People from Sliven
20th-century Bulgarian people
20th-century Bulgarian painters
20th-century male artists
1941 births
2018 deaths
Male painters